Jarl Birger Kivelä (20 December 1920 – 27 September 2013) was a Finnish diver who competed at the 1952 Summer Olympics in Helsinki, where he finished 13th in a field of 31 competitors in the men's 10 metre platform event. He was born in Helsinki and served as the President of the Finnish Swimming Association in the early 1970s. From the mid-1990s until his death he competed in master's level diving championships.

References

1920 births
2013 deaths
Divers at the 1952 Summer Olympics
Olympic divers of Finland
Finnish male divers